Go pro may refer to:
GoPro, brand of small cameras and camcorders and also a drone manufacturer
Go professional, a professional player in the game of Go